Janeth Marcia Caizalitín Tenorio (born April 21, 1974, in Salcedo, Cotopaxi) is a retired female athlete from Ecuador,

She competed in the middle-distance events. She represented her native country at the 1992 Summer Olympics.

Personal bests
800 m: 2:07.14 min – Cuenca, October 1998
1500 m: 4:17.70 min – Manaus, 15 September 1990 
3000 m: 9:27.43 min – Santa Fe, 25 June 1989

Achievements

References

External links

1974 births
Living people
Ecuadorian female middle-distance runners
Ecuadorian female long-distance runners
Olympic athletes of Ecuador
Athletes (track and field) at the 1992 Summer Olympics
Pan American Games competitors for Ecuador
Athletes (track and field) at the 1999 Pan American Games
South American Games gold medalists for Ecuador
South American Games silver medalists for Ecuador
South American Games medalists in athletics
Competitors at the 1990 South American Games
Competitors at the 1998 South American Games
20th-century Ecuadorian women